Alireza Jafarzadeh is a media commentator on the Middle East and an active dissident figure to the Iranian government. He is best known for revealing the existence of clandestine nuclear facilities in Iran in 2002. At the time of the revelation, Jafarzadeh acted as the chief congressional liaison and public spokesperson for the United States representative office of the National Council of Resistance of Iran (NCRI). He is currently also the president of Strategic Policy Consulting, Inc., as well as a FOX News Foreign Affairs Analyst.

Jafarzadeh is also the author of a 304-paged book (The Iran Threat: President Ahmadinejad and the Coming Nuclear Crisis) about Mahmoud Ahmadinejad, the former President of Iran, and his alleged interest in developing nuclear weapons. He is also the U.S. representative of the People's Mujahedin of Iran.

Early life 
Jafarzadeh was born in Mashhad, Imperial State of Iran where he finished his high school education. He then started his higher education in Metallurgical Engineering at Aryamehr University of Technology, which is now [Sharif University of Technology]. He moved to the United States before the 1979 Iranian Revolution. In the USA he studied civil engineering, obtaining his bachelor's degree from the University of Michigan in Ann Arbor, and a master's degree from the University of Texas at Austin.

Work 
Jafarzadeh has published columns and appeared on television interviews both on conservative as well as the liberal media. He seems to have bi-partisan respect for his work. Jafarzadeh has a regular column on the Huffington Post.  He has also widely published on the FoxNews.com. 
On August 14, 2002, Jafarzadeh drew worldwide attention by revealing that Iran was running a secret nuclear facility in Natanz, and a dideuterium oxide facility in Arak. These revelations led to inspections of the sites by the International Atomic Energy Agency (IAEA). After their first inspection, IAEA, said in a report on Iran's nuclear activity that traces of uranium, greater than what is needed for a civilian power program, were found on Iranian nuclear equipment, although Iran claimed that the source of the uranium was from equipment imported to Iran from Pakistan. These revelations eventually led to United Nations Security Council's imposing sanctions on Iran on December 23, 2006, over its nuclear program.

On May 15, 2003, as spokesman for the NCRI, Jafarzadeh also alleged that Iran was running programs for biological and microbial weapons. On March 16, 2005, US President George W. Bush said Iran's hidden nuclear program had been discovered "because a dissident group pointed it out to the world." Later that day, White House aides acknowledged that the dissident group cited by the president was the National Council of Resistance of Iran (NCRI). On January 5, 2007, Jafarzadeh claimed that Iran's government had sharply increased its efforts to fan sectarian violence in Iraq, easily transferring money and arms across the Iraqi border. In his news conference, Jafarzadeh provided details of the Iranian forces, including the Quds Force, commanders, resources and plans for Iran sustaining a large-scale terror network in Iraq.

On September 9, 2010, Jafarzadeh made yet another significant revelation about a secret underground uranium enrichment facility under construction in Behjat-abad near Tehran where satellite imagery along with details of the program drew international attention.

In April 2011, in a press conference in Washington, D.C., Jafarzadeh revealed a new nuclear site, known as TABA, where Iran has been secretly building centrifuge parts. Iran had to concede to the existence of this site two days later.

In July 2011, in an exclusive interview with the Associated Press in Washington, D.C., Jafarzadeh exposed for the first time the reorganization of Iran's nuclear program and the formation of a new organization run by the Defense Ministry, known by its Persian acronym, SPND, which oversees all nuclear weaponization work under the direct supervision of Iran's top nuclear scientist, Mohsen Fakhrizadeh Mahabadi. The information was compiled by the network inside Iran of Iran's opposition group, the MEK. This information provided by Jafarzadeh was later reflected in the November 2011 report of the International Atomic Energy Agency (IAEA).

In April 2012, in an article in the Baltimore Sun, Jafarzadeh exposed further details about Iran forming a new organization under the Islamic Revolutionary Guards Corp to concentrate all the activities of the nuclear program to accelerate its bomb making.

In November 2014, in a press conference in the Washington office of the National Council of Resistance of Iran, Jafarzadeh revealed that Iran had built 2 explosive chambers, not one as previously believed; that Saeed Borji is the key person responsible for explosive chambers design and installation at Parchin military site in southeast Tehran; that Ukrainian expert Vycheslav V. Danilenko was directly involved in design and installation of the explosive chamber; his son-in-law was part of the project when in Iran; and that Tehran used various covers to conceal its nuclear weaponization activities, and the main organization (SPND) under the direction of Mohsen Fakhrizadeh formed by the Defense Ministry in 2011 to overtake all nuclear weapons related activities is actually heading all such projects in Parchin. This new information showed that Iran actively pursued weaponization way past 2006 and has sought foreign expertise, companies, and constantly changed cover to hide its nuclear weapons program.

In February 2015, in a high-profile press conference in the National Press Building, Jafarzadeh revealed that Iran has a hidden site, known as Lavizan-3, in a military complex in Tehran, where Iran has worked on research and development of advanced centrifuges, including IR-2m, and secretly enriched uranium in violation of the Joint Plan of Action. Members of Congress asked Secretary John Kerry about Lavizan-3, which he promised to follow up, but there are no follow up reports in the media, suggesting that the United States or the IAEA has acted on this.

Jafarzadeh in the media 
On January 15, 2007, Jafarzadeh was a guest on CNN's Lou Dobbs Tonight news show (6:00 pm ET) discussing Iran's proxy war in Iraq. Jafarzadeh claimed that Iran has 32,000 mercenaries on its payroll in Iraq sabotaging the reconstruction and stabilization efforts.

As late as December 14, 2006, Jafarzadeh was introduced as the past representative of the National Council of Resistance of Iran in an interview with Claude Salhani in which he responded to comments by Mahmoud Ahmadinejad made towards Israel.

As of 2010, Jafarzadeh is a Foreign Affairs Analyst for Fox News, a position he has held since 2003 and is often a guest on Voice of America, or ABC Radio Network's John Batchelor Show. He has lectured at Georgetown University and the University of Michigan. He currently lives and works in Washington, D.C. in the United States.

According to his official website, "Jafarzadeh has frequently appeared on major television and radio broadcasts", including Fox News Channel, CNN, MSNBC, CBS Evening News, NBC, ABC, BBC, Sky News, ITN, VOA, and NPR.

On September 24, 2008, Jafarzadeh appeared on foxnews.com "The Strategy Room" with host Heather Nauert, to discuss Mahmoud Ahmadinejad's UN appearance.

On 20 March 2009, Jafarzadeh appeared on CBS Evening News commenting on President Barack Obama's New Year Nowrouz message to the Iranian people.

In June 2009, in the morning of the presidential elections, Jafarzadeh appeared on national television, including Fox News Channel and predicted that Ahmadinejad would be declared the winner of the election, in sharp contrast to the views of almost all other prominent Iran experts.

In February 2010, Jafarzadeh appeared on Fox News Channel suggesting that nuclear negotiations with Tehran would not succeed and that Ahmadinejad would become bolder, unless the international community would exploit what he described as extensive potential for change in Iran.

In March 2012, in an interview with Geraldo at Large on Fox News, Jafarzadeh appeared with Governor Bill Richardson discussing the prospects of Iran policy and what needs to be done to counter the Iranian threat.

In April 2012, in a commentary in the Huffington Post, Jafarzadeh argued that the nuclear talks are doomed to lead to nowhere, as Tehran's agenda is to buy time while building the bomb.

In May 2012, Jafarzadeh, in a commentary in the McClatchy News highlighted the need to counter the Iranian nuclear threat, arguing that over thirty years of concessions made to Tehran has been counterproductive.

In December 2013, regarding the nuclear talks that had just started, in a commentary in the Baltimore Sun, he warned about the Iranian regime's true intentions.

In April 2015, he published in The Hill arguing that it is time for Congress to act in light of Iranian regime's delay tactics during the nuclear negotiations.

Strategic Policy Consulting
Jafarzadeh heads his own company, Strategic Policy Consulting, Inc., (SPC) where he consults as an expert on the nuclear program of Iran, terrorism, and Islamic extremism.

SPC was formed in October 2003 and its website lists an address at 1717 Pennsylvania Ave. N.W. Suite 1025. According to the SPC website, its members have worked professionally with the US Congress, media, agencies, institutions and universities in order to deliver analysis, policy suggestions, and research for more than 10 years.

Controversy
Jafarzadeh's association with the National Council of Resistance of Iran (NCRI) which is associated with the People's Mujahedin of Iran (Mujahedin-e Khalq, MEK, PMOI, or MKO) was a source of controversy for some time. Jafarzadeh was the public spokesperson for the National Council of Resistance of Iran until its office in Washington was closed by the US State Department in 2003 on the grounds that it was too closely associated with the People's Mujahedin of Iran, which is listed as a terrorist organisation by the US State Department.

Jafarzadeh's name appeared in the media in a Houston Chronicle article dated December 24, 1986, where he is described as a spokesman for the MEK. In the article he denied US State Department claims that the MEK was a terrorist organization responsible for the assassination of at least six Americans in Iran, a charge that is vehemently denied by MEK. In the same article, Jafarzadeh compared the MEK's resistance activities to those of the US Founding Fathers.

The Bush administration identified the MEK as being a terrorist organization supported by Saddam Hussein.  Controversy erupted when it was revealed that John Ashcroft, a Senator at the time, had pushed for the delisting of the organization as a terrorist group after extensive lobbying efforts by Jafarzadeh.  The designation was removed in 2012 as a result of a decision by then Secretary of State Hillary Clinton.  MEK members in Iraq had been disarmed after the Iraq War. The decision was made after the organization agreed to help with removal of its members from Camp Ashraf in Iraq and their resettlement to other countries.

References

External links
 

Iranian emigrants to the United States
Iranian activists
Living people
Nuclear program of Iran
University of Michigan College of Engineering alumni
Cockrell School of Engineering alumni
People's Mojahedin Organization of Iran members
American activists
People from Mashhad
Year of birth missing (living people)